Wallaman is a rural locality in the Shire of Hinchinbrook, Queensland, Australia.

Geography 
The locality is totally within the Girringun National Park. Wallaman Falls is within both the national park and the locality.

References 

Shire of Hinchinbrook
Localities in Queensland